A mega-Earth is a proposed neologism for a massive terrestrial exoplanet that is at least ten times the mass of Earth. Mega-Earths would be substantially more massive than super-Earths (terrestrial and ocean planets with masses around 5–10 Earths). The term "mega-Earth" was coined in 2014, when Kepler-10c was revealed to be a Neptune-mass planet with a density considerably greater than that of Earth, though it has since been determined to be a typical volatile-rich planet weighing just under half that mass.

Examples
Kepler-10c was the first exoplanet to be classified as a mega-Earth. At the time of its discovery, it was believed to have a mass around 17 times that of Earth and a radius around 2.3 times Earth's, giving it a high density that implied a mainly rocky composition. However, several follow-up radial velocity studies produced different results for Kepler-10c's mass, all much below the original  estimate.

At the time of its discovery in 2016, it had the highest chance of being rocky for a planet its size, with a posterior probability that it is dense enough to be terrestrial at about 0.43. For comparison, at the time the corresponding probability for Kepler-10c was calculated as 0.1, and as 0.002 for Kepler-131b.

It likely has an Earth-like composition of rock and iron without any volatiles. Its composition appears to be mainly rock with a small iron core and a relatively thin steam atmosphere.

References

Works cited

Further reading
Astronomers Find "Mega-Earth," Most Massive Rocky Planet Yet, BY MARCUS WOO FOR NATIONAL GEOGRAPHIC, JUNE 5, 2014
Impossibly heavy planet is the first 'mega-Earth', New Scientist, 2 June 2014, By Jacob Aron
Kepler space telescope spies a ‘Mega-Earth’, Washington Post, June 2 2014
'Godzilla of Earths': Alien Planet 17 Times Heavier Than Our World Discovered, By Miriam Kramer June 02, 2014

 

Types of planet
Giant planets